Ignatyevsky is a rural locality (a khutor) and the administrative center of Ignatyevskoye Rural Settlement of Koshekhablsky District, Adygea, Russia. The population of this khutor was 916 as of 2018. There are 19 streets.

Geography 
Ignatyevsky is located 9 km south of Koshekhabl (the district's administrative centre) by road. Blechepsin is the nearest rural locality.

Ethnicity 
The Khutor is inhabited by Russians, Armenians, Adygheans, Avars, Uzbeks and Tatars.

References 

Rural localities in Koshekhablsky District